Disney+ Hotstar (also known as Hotstar) is an Indian brand of subscription video on-demand over-the-top streaming service owned by Novi Digital Entertainment of Disney Star and operated by Disney Media and Entertainment Distribution, both divisions of The Walt Disney Company. Initially, the platform launched as Hotstar in February 2015 by Star India.

Indian original programming

Hotstar Specials
Hotstar Specials is a content hub and label of Hotstar under which the platform releases their original programming created exclusively for the service. The label launched with the docu-drama Roar of the Lion on 20 March 2019.

Drama

Serials

Comedy

Animation

Unscripted

Continuations

Hotstar Originals

Drama

Comedy

Variety

Continuations

Stage productions
Cineplay is an original Hotstar theater series in which Plays are presented in cinematic style.

Exclusive international distribution

Non-English language

Southeast Asian original programming
Disney+ Hotstar also carries the Southeast Asian original programming that is commissioned exclusively in their respective regions.

Hotstar Originals

Drama

Comedy

Animation

Continuations

Exclusive shows

Drama

Comedy

Animation

Co-productions

Disney+ Originals

These shows are commissioned by Disney+ and are available exclusively on the platform in India and selected Southeast Asian countries as Disney+ was integrated within the service in April 2020.

Co-productions
These shows have been commissioned by Disney+ in cooperation with a partner network.

Continuations
These shows have been picked up by Disney+ for additional seasons after having aired previous seasons on another network.

Exclusive distribution

Exclusive international distribution

The following shows are the general entertainment from Disney subsidiaries, including FX, Freeform, Hulu, Star, Star+, ABC Signature, 20th Television, 20th Television Animation for streaming exclusively on Disney+ Hotstar. This list also includes content from Disney's kids' networks that doesn't air on television in served regions.

Drama

Comedy

Animation

Adult animation

Anime

Kids & family

Unscripted

Docuseries

Reality

Continuations

Specials

One-time

Non-English language

French

Japanese

Korean

Mandarin

Spanish

Other

Exclusive third-party distribution

Drama

Anime

Sports

Unscripted

Continuations

Former exclusive third-party distribution
The following shows that previously streamed on the platform but were not originally commissioned by Hotstar.

Upcoming original programming

Indian original programming

Hotstar Specials

Drama

Comedy

Continuations

Southeast Asian original programming

Hotstar Originals

Drama

Disney+ Originals

Upcoming exclusive distribution

Exclusive international distribution

Drama

Continuations

Exclusive third-party distribution

Drama

Notes

References

Original programs distributed by Hotstar
Hotstar
 
Disney Star